Gülnezer Bextiyar (born 2 May 1992), also known by her pinyin transliteration name Gulinazha or simply Nazha, is an ethnic Uyghur Chinese actress and model who graduated from the Beijing Film Academy in 2011.

Early life and education
Gulnazar was born on 2 May 1992 in Ürümqi, Xinjiang, China. She attended Xinjiang Arts University, majoring in dancing when she was young. At the age of 16, she participated in a modeling contest where she took home the award for the "Most Photogenic". Gulnazar auditioned for the Beijing Film Academy in 2011. During the audition, her unique appearance received attention and her photos were taken and published online. Due to the exposure, she was discovered and signed on by Tangren Media.

Career
In 2012, Gulnazar made her acting debut in the television series Xuan-Yuan Sword: Scar of Sky and rose to fame for her role as Yu Xiaoxue.

In 2013, Gulnazar made her big-screen debut in the police film Police Story 2013. She then starred in comedy film The Breakup Guru and action film Black & White: The Dawn of Justice, and received the Newcomer award at the Golden Phoenix Awards.

In 2016, Gulnazar played her first leading role in the fantasy historical drama The Classic of Mountains and Seas. The same year, she played the role of Diaochan in the historical fiction drama  God of War, Zhao Yun; and the female lead in the fantasy action drama Chinese Paladin 5, based on the video game of the same title.

In 2017, Gulnazar starred in the fantasy action drama Fighter of the Destiny alongside Lu Han. The drama was a commercial success and attained high ratings during its run. The same year, she starred in the music film City of Rock as a rebellious guitar player. Her performance received positive reviews, and she was won the Breakthrough Actress award at the Huading Awards.

In 2018, Gulnazar was once again cast as Diaochan in the historical film Dynasty Warriors, based on the video game of the same name.

In 2019, Gulnazar starred in the romance drama Ten Years Late, based on the Japanese manga series Asunaro Hakusho alongside Shawn Dou; where she played a travel service product manager.

In 2021, Gulnazar starred in the crime action drama Dancing in the Storm as a criminal profiler, alongside William Chan.

Other activities

Endorsements
In 2018, the jewelry brand Qeelin chose Gulnazar to become its ambassador.

In 2019, Sergio Rossi announced the appointment of Gulnazar as its first Brand Ambassador for the Greater China region.

In 2019, Gulnazar was chosen as brand spokesperson for the eyewear brand PRSR.

In 2020, Chando announced Gulnazar as their global spokesperson for skincare products.

In 2020, Silk'n announced Gulnazar as their brand global spokesperson.

In 2021, Triumph announced Gulnazar as their brand's first spokesperson for the Asia Pacific region.

Personal life 
On August 9, 2015, actor Hans Zhang revealed on Sina Weibo that he was in a relationship with his The Classic of Mountains and Seas co-star Gulnazar. On December 25, 2017, the representatives of both issued a statement stating that the two broke up amicably in mid-October 2017.

Filmography

Film

Television series

Short film

Variety show

Music video

Discography

Awards and nominations

References

External links

 
 
 
 Gülnezer Bextiyar at Sina Weibo

Actresses from Xinjiang
Uyghur people
Living people
Chinese film actresses
Chinese television actresses
1992 births
People from Ürümqi
Beijing Film Academy alumni
Tangren Media
21st-century Chinese actresses